Great Outdoor Games was a series of televised outdoor games created by ESPN.  The program was cancelled in 2006.

Great Outdoor Games individual events include:

 Fishing Events
 Fly Fishing
 Freshwater Doubles
 Sporting Dog Events
 Agility 
 Disc Drive (disc dog)
 Big Air (dock jumping)
 Flyball (flyball)
 Retriever Trials (field trial)
 Target Events
 Archery
 Rifle
 Shotgun
Timber Events
 Boom Run
 Log rolling
 Team Relay
 Endurance
 Speed Climbing
 Tree Topping
 Hot Saw
 Springboard
 New Events for 2014
 Dump 'Em Out
 Log Jam

External links
 Great Outdoor Games V

ESPN